Fernando Larrazábal Bretón (born 11 August 1962) is a Mexican politician who was a member of the National Action Party. He has served as mayor of San Nicolás and was a member of the LXXI Legislature of the Congress of Nuevo León from 2006 to 2009. He was municipal president of Monterrey between 2009 and 2012.

Personal life and education
Larrazábal was born in Oaxaca City, Oaxaca on 11 August 1962. He attended the Monterrey Institute of Technology and Higher Education from 1980 to 1984, graduating with a civil engineering degree.

Larrazábal is married to Eleonora Cárdenas with whom he has three young daughters.

His brother Jaime is also a politician.

See also 
 2009 Nuevo León state election
 2000 Nuevo León state election

References

1962 births
Living people
Mexican people of Basque descent
Municipal presidents of Monterrey
Politicians from Oaxaca
National Action Party (Mexico) politicians
Members of the Chamber of Deputies (Mexico)
21st-century Mexican politicians
Municipal presidents in Nuevo León
People from Oaxaca City
Members of the Congress of Nuevo León
Monterrey Institute of Technology and Higher Education